Glenn Lyndon Taylor (born 23 September 1970) is a former New Zealand rugby union player. He was a member of the New Zealand national side, the All Blacks, in 1992 and 1996, playing six matches including one international for the side.

References

1970 births
Living people
Rugby union players from Whangārei
New Zealand rugby union players
New Zealand international rugby union players
Chiefs (rugby union) players
Hurricanes (rugby union) players
Blues (Super Rugby) players
Northland rugby union players
People educated at Dargaville High School
Rugby union flankers
Rugby union locks